Gorkovskoye is a rural locality (a selo) and the administrative center of Gorkovsky Selsoviet, Shipunovsky District, Altai Krai, Russia. The population was 1,150 as of 2013. There are 14 streets.

Geography 
Gorkovskoye is located 23 km southwest of Shipunovo (the district's administrative centre) by road. Mirny is the nearest rural locality.

References 

Rural localities in Shipunovsky District